Paracuneus immaculatus is a species of sea snail, a marine gastropod mollusk in the family Drilliidae.

Subspecies
  Paracuneus immaculatus peronianus (Tenison-Woods, 1876), occurring in Quarantine Bay, New South Wales, Australia. .: synonym of Paracuneus immaculatus (Tenison-Woods, 1876) 
  Paracuneus spadix tumulus (Watson, 1886) found at a depth of 125 m. off Twofold Bay, NSW, Australia. It has become a synonym of Paracuneus immaculatus (Tenison-Woods, 1876)

Description
The shell grows to a length of 19 mm, its diameter 6 mm.

(Original description) The white and shining shell is fusiformly turreted. The spire is acute. The shell contains 9 sloping whorls. These are canaliculate at the sutures, angulate and
obsoletely tuberculate above, and transversely obsoletely lirate. The aperture is oval. The outer lipis thin. The sinus is conspicuous. The lip is simple and tuberculate above.

Distribution
This marine species is endemic to Australia and occurs in the demersal zone off New South Wales, Victoria and Tasmania, Australia.

References

 Watson, R.B. 1886. Report on the Scaphopoda and Gastropoda collected by H.M.S. Challenger during the years 1873–1876. Report on the Scientific Results of the Voyage of H.M.S. Challenger 1873–1876, Zoology 15(42): 756 pp., 50 pls
 Pritchard, G.B. & Gatliff, J.H. 1899. On some new species of Victorian mollusca. Proceedings of the Royal Society of Victoria n.s. 12(1): 100–106, pl. 8 
 Tate, R. & May, W.L. 1901. A revised census of the marine Mollusca of Tasmania. Proceedings of the Linnean Society of New South Wales 26(3): 344–471
 Hedley, C. 1903. Scientific results of the trawling expedition of H.M.C.S. "Thetis" off the coast of New South Wales in February and March, 1898. Mollusca. Part II. Scaphopoda and Gastropoda. Memoirs of the Australian Museum 4(6): 325–402, pls 36–37
  Hedley, C. 1922. A revision of the Australian Turridae. Records of the Australian Museum 13(6): 213–359, pls 42–56 
 May, W.L. 1923. An Illustrated Index of Tasmanian Shells: with 47 plates and 1052 species. Hobart : Government Printer 100 pp. 
 Laseron, C. 1954. Revision of the New South Wales Turridae (Mollusca). Australian Zoological Handbook. Sydney : Royal Zoological Society of New South Wales 1–56, pls 1–12.
 Wilson, B. 1994. Australian Marine Shells. Prosobranch Gastropods. Kallaroo, WA : Odyssey Publishing Vol. 2 370 pp.

External links
  Tucker, J.K. 2004 Catalog of recent and fossil turrids (Mollusca: Gastropoda). Zootaxa 682:1–1295
 

immaculatus
Gastropods of Australia
Gastropods described in 1876